Burkeville Independent School District is a public school district based in the community of Burkeville, Texas (USA). The district has three campuses - Burkeville High School (Grades 9-12), Burkeville Middle School (Grades 7-8) and Burkeville Elementary School (Grades PK-6).

In 2009, the school district was rated "academically acceptable" by the Texas Education Agency.

References

External links
Official website

School districts in Newton County, Texas